The Canal Street station (formerly Canal Street–Holland Tunnel) is an express station on the IND Eighth Avenue Line of the New York City Subway. Located at the intersection of Canal Street, Vestry Street, and Sixth Avenue (Avenue of the Americas) in Lower Manhattan, it is served by the A and E trains at all times, and the C train at all times except late nights.

History
The station opened on September 10, 1932, as part of the city-operated Independent Subway System (IND)'s initial segment, the Eighth Avenue Line between Chambers Street and 207th Street. Construction of the whole line cost $191.2 million. Service at this station was provided with express service from its onset.

On February 17, 1953, the New York City Board of Transportation installed two devices at either end of the station to alert police of passers-by above of emergencies in the station. The devices, which cost $1,100, were called "Call-a-Cop." In the station agent booth, an agent could set off an alarm bell and turn on a red warning light aboveground at Canal and Walker Streets on Sixth Avenue by lightly pushing on a treadle. The warning lights were placed atop eight-feet tall metal poles located at subway entrances. This device would have been installed at other stations if the pilot here was successful.

Station layout

There are two diamond crossovers allowing express trains to cross to the local track or local trains to cross to the express track. One is located to the south of the station for downtown (southbound) trains and the other is located to the north of the station for uptown (northbound) trains; this can be a bottleneck for trains in either direction. The platforms are offset, and a signal tower is located at the south end of the southbound platform.

This underground station is located on the street of the same name, which is the boundary of SoHo and Tribeca. The station sits one block west from the entrance to the Holland Tunnel outside of the Tribeca North Historic District. Much of the surrounding area is characterized by its historic loft architecture.

Several public parks are located near the station. Above the north end of the station at Canal Street and 6th Avenue are Albert Capsouto Park, Duarte Square, and Grand Canal Court. At the south end of the station at Walker Street is Tribeca Park. Several blocks to the west at the end of Canal Street are Canal Park and Hudson River Park. St. John's Park formerly existed two blocks west of the station; the site is now occupied by Holland Tunnel exit ramps.

Track layout

South of this station, the tracks split into two levels and cross at a flying junction. These were intended to allow for the construction of a future junction with a proposed line under Worth Street as part of the IND Second System. The proposed route would have run under Worth Street and East Broadway, and crossed the East River to Brooklyn. The bellmouths for this proposed route are visible from the E train headed towards and coming from the World Trade Center station. On the tunnel wall where the turnout is, there is an arrow painted with the words reading: "Worth St." written next to it.

Exits

The station contains six open exits. Only one exit is located at the station's namesake – Canal Street – at the northeast corner of Sixth Avenue and Canal Street. The other exit leading from the northern section of the station leads to the south side of Laight Street, between Sixth Avenue and St. Johns Lane. At the center of the station there are exits to the northwest and northeast corners of Sixth Avenue and West Broadway. At the southern end of the station there are two exits. One exit leads to the northeast corner of Walker Street and Sixth Avenue, while the other leads to the AT&T Building.

The station also has three closed exits. One exit, located at the southern end of the station, led to the southeast corner of Walker Street and West Broadway. The other two are located in a passageway that extends further north than the current northernmost open exit; one led to the southeast corner of Grand Street and Sixth Avenue. The passageway currently houses employee facilities.

References

External links 

 
 nycsubway.org — A Gathering Artwork by Martin & Munoz (unknown date)
 Station Reporter — A Lefferts
 Station Reporter — A Rockaway
 Station Reporter — C Train
 Station Reporter — E Train
 MTA's Arts For Transit — Canal Street (IND Eighth Avenue Line)
 Canal Street entrance from Google Maps Street View
 Laight Street entrance from Google Maps Street View
 West Broadway entrance from Google Maps Street View
 Beach Street — Walker Street entrance from Google Maps Street View
Platforms from Google Maps Street View

IND Eighth Avenue Line stations
Sixth Avenue
New York City Subway stations in Manhattan
Railway stations in the United States opened in 1932
1932 establishments in New York City
Tribeca
SoHo, Manhattan